Six Mile Lake, Nova Scotia  is a lake about 2 Kilometers west of Halifax City in the Halifax Regional Municipality, Nova Scotia, Canada.

See also
 List of lakes in Nova Scotia

References
 National Resources Canada

Lakes of Nova Scotia